Idaea tristega is a moth of the family Geometridae. It is found in northern Madagascar.

This species is very variable in size and warmth of the ground-colour. It is tinged reddish to cinnamon-brown with a wingspan of 14-22mm.

References

Sterrhini
Moths described in 1932
Moths of Madagascar